David Ellsworth Grange Jr. (April 9, 1925 – September 11, 2022) was a lieutenant general in the United States Army.

Early life
Grange was born on April 9, 1925, in Richmond Hill, New York, New York City, and grew up in Lake Ronkonkoma, New York. He joined the United States Army in June 1943 and served as an enlisted parachute infantryman in Europe, taking part in the Rome-Arno, Southern France, Rhineland, Ardennes, and Central Europe Campaigns as a member of the 517th Parachute Infantry Regiment. In 1949, he departed the 82d Airborne Division to attend Officer Candidate School. He was commissioned a second lieutenant of Infantry in 1950, with an initial assignment with the 187th Airborne Infantry Regiment in Korea.

Education
Grange was a graduate of the Strategic Intelligence Course, the Russian language course at the Defense Language Institute, the Command and General Staff College, and the Army War College. He held a Bachelor of Arts degree in History from the University of Omaha and has attended the Advanced Management Course for Executives at the University of Pittsburgh.

Assignments
Grange served in a variety of assignments, including: two tours in Korea as a Rifle Platoon Leader (1950–51) and Rifle Company Commander (1952–53); Ranger Instructor; Staff Officer, Department of the Army Staff, Pentagon; 10th Special Forces Group, Germany (1957–60); Advisor in the Republic of Vietnam (1st tour) (1963–64); AcofS, G1, 82nd Airborne Division; Commander 2nd Battalion, 506th Infantry (Vietnam) (2nd tour) (1967–68); Commander, DISCOM, 101st Airborne Division (Vietnam) (3rd tour) (1970–71); Commander, 3rd Brigade, 101st Airborne Division (Vietnam) (3rd tour) (1970–71); Director, Ranger Department, United States Army Infantry School; Assistant Division Commander (Support), 4th Infantry Division; Assistant Division Commander (Maneuver), 4th Infantry Division; Chief of Staff, I Corps (ROK/US Group), Korea.

Toward the end of his career, Grange served in a variety of high level command assignments including Commanding General, United States Army Readiness and Mobilization Region VIII (1976–78); Commanding General, 2nd Infantry Division, Korea (1978–79); Commanding General, United States Army Infantry School, Fort Benning, Georgia (1979–81); and, finally, Commanding General, Sixth United States Army (1981–84). Grange retired in June 1984, after 41 years of service.

Grange is among the few paratroopers in United States Army history to make three combat jumps—one during World War II (Southern France) and two in Korea (the Battle of Yongju and Operation Tomahawk). His other distinctions include three awards each of the Combat Infantryman Badge (for World War II, Korea and Vietnam) and the Silver Star for heroism in combat.

Personal life and legacy
In 1982, the annual "David E. Grange Jr. Best Ranger Competition" was founded. His son, David L. Grange, also went on to serve as a United States Army general officer.

Grange died on September 11, 2022, at the age of 97.

Awards and decorations
Lieutenant General Grange's numerous decorations, medals and badges include:

General Grange was an inaugural member of the U.S. Army Ranger Hall of Fame and the U.S. Army Officer Candidate Hall of Fame. He was selected as 1984 Airborne Trooper of the Year by the Airborne Association, was the 1994 recipient of the Infantry's "Doughboy Award," and was named an honorary Sergeant Major of the Army by the Association of the United States Army in 2016.

References

1925 births
2022 deaths
United States Army generals
United States Army personnel of World War II
United States Army personnel of the Korean War
United States Army personnel of the Vietnam War
Officiers of the Légion d'honneur
Recipients of the Distinguished Service Medal (US Army)
Recipients of the Silver Star
Recipients of the Legion of Merit
Recipients of the Distinguished Flying Cross (United States)
Recipients of the Gallantry Cross (Vietnam)
Recipients of the Defense Distinguished Service Medal
Recipients of the Soldier's Medal
People from Lake Ronkonkoma, New York
People from Richmond Hill, Queens
Military personnel from New York City
United States Army Command and General Staff College alumni
University of Nebraska Omaha alumni
Defense Language Institute alumni
American expatriates in Germany